Shalimar Television Network (STN) was the first semi governmental television channel of Pakistan, the first to break up the monopoly of state-owned Pakistan Television (PTV). STN started its broadcast in 1990 with the name of People's Television Network (PTN) under the umbrella of Shalimar Recording Company from Islamabad. Later on, its transmissions were started from Karachi, Lahore and by the mid-1990s, it was available in the whole country at terrestrial beam. In 1991, the name of PTN was changed to STN (Shalimar TV Network)

History
PTN under settlements with CNN International of USA and British Broadcasting Corporation, BBC of UK started rebroadcast of the programming of CNN International channel and BBC World.

STN-As Channel-3
In 1999, NTM had to quit the airwaves because of the financial crunch. Right after this, STN also ended the re-broadcast programs of CNN Intentional, BBC World and DW. In 1999, under a settlement with PTV Network, STN became "Channel-3". A Satellite beam was also arranged for STN/Channel-3 and it started its broadcast from PTV Academy. Each rebroadcast station of STN on terrestrial airwaves was connected to the satellite beam of STN/Channel. Channel-3 started its regular transmission in 2000 as an all-purpose channel. Slots of 'Prime Entertainment'  and 'Sunday TV'  were quite popular among the audience as the quality of entertainment programming were quite good.

Replacement of STN by ATV
In 2005, STN/Channel-3 went off the air and the parent company Shalimar Recording and Broadcasting Company signed an agreement with Sports Star International to start the first ever semi-private channel of Pakistan ATV (Pakistan) channel, the collaboration stayed intact till 2018. From 2018-2020, ATV ran solely under SRBC solely as a semi-government TV Channel. In 2020, it again got a partner from private sector.

References

External links
 http://atv.com.pk/, ATV (Pakistan) official website

Television networks in Pakistan
Mass media companies of Pakistan